Six-Gun Snow White is a 2013 fantasy novella by Catherynne M. Valente, retelling the story of Snow White in a mythical version of the Old West. It was published by Subterranean Press.

Reception
Six-Gun Snow White won the 2014 Locus Award for Best Novella, and was nominated for the Nebula Award for Best Novella of 2013, the 2014 Hugo Award for Best Novella, and the 2014 World Fantasy Award—Long Fiction.

Publishers Weekly  considered it to be "witty" with "complex reverberations", and lauded "the originality of the atmosphere" and "the simple pleasure of savoring Valente’s exuberant writing". Kirkus Reviews praised Valente's "enjoyably distinctive voice", and the "fascinating details" of the setting, judging the whole as "engaging and delightfully written", but noting that the conclusion "rushes in unexpectedly".

References

2013 American novels
Novels based on fairy tales
Western (genre) novels
Works based on Snow White
Native Americans in popular culture
American fantasy novels
American novellas
Subterranean Press books